Lopatica may refer to the following places:

Moldova
 Lopățica

North Macedonia
 Lopatica (Prilep)
 Lopatica (Bitola)